This is a demography of the population of Bahrain including population density, ethnicity, education level, health of the populace, economic status, religious affiliations and other aspects of the population.

Most of the population of Bahrain is concentrated in the two principal cities, Manama and Al Muharraq.

Ethnic groups 

Regarding the ethnicity of Bahrainis, a Financial Times article published on 31 May 1983 found that "Bahrain is a polyglot state, both religiously and racially. Discounting temporary immigrants of the past ten years, there are at least eight or nine communities on the island". These may be classified as:

Non-nationals make up more than half of the population of Bahrain, with immigrants making up about 52.6% of the overall population.  Of those, the vast majority come from South and Southeast Asia: according to various media reports and government statistics dated between 2005 and 2009 roughly 350,000 Indians, 150,000 Bangladeshis, 110,000 Pakistanis, 45,000 Filipinos, and 8,000 Indonesians. 11,000 people from the United Kingdom live in Bahrain, 0.73% of its total population.

Population

Population census

Population estimates on July 1

Vital statistics

UN estimates

Registered data 

Birth registration of Bahrain is available from 1976, death registration started in 1990. Between 1976 and 2011 the number of baby births roughly doubled but the birth rate of babies decreased from 32 to 13 per 1,000. The death rate of Bahrain (1.9 per 1,000 human beings in 2011) is among the lowest in the world.

Structure of the population 
Population by Sex and Age Group (Census 17.III.2020):

Life expectancy 

Source: UN World Population Prospects

Religion

Islam is the official religion forming 74% of the population. Current census data does not differentiate between the other religions in Bahrain, but the country has about 9% Christian citizens and about 40 Jewish citizens.

According to the website of Ministry of Information Affairs, 74% of the population are Muslim, with Christians being the second largest religious group, forming 10.2% of the population, Jews making up 0.21%. The percentage of local Bahraini Christians, Jews, Hindus and Baha’is is collectively 0.2%.

Bahraini citizens of Muslim faith belong to the Shi'a and Sunni branches of Islam. The last official census (1941) to include sectarian identification reported 52% (88,298 citizens) as Shia and 48% as Sunni of the Muslim population. Unofficial sources, such as the Library of Congress Country Studies, and The New York Times, estimate sectarian identification to be approximately 45% Sunni and 55% Shia. An official Bahraini document revealed that 51% of the country's citizens are Sunnis, while the Shiite population has declined to 49% of the Muslim population.

Foreigners, overwhelmingly from South Asia and other Arab countries, constituted 52.6% of the population in 2020. Of these, 50.9% are Muslim and 49.1% are non-Muslim, including Christians (primarily: Catholic, Protestant, Syriac Orthodox, and Mar Thoma from South India), Hindus, Buddhists, Baháʼís, and Sikhs.

Languages 
Arabic
English
Persian
Kurdish
Malayalam
Urdu
Balochi
Konkani
Hindi
Sinhalese
Tamil
Punjabi
Bengali
Armenian
Filipino

See also 
 Bahranis
 Shrinathji Temple, Bahrain

References

Notes

Sources 

2003 U.S. Department of State website